The following lists events that happened during 1879 in the Kingdom of Belgium.

Incumbents
Monarch: Leopold II
Prime Minister: Walthère Frère-Orban

Events

 2 March – Castle in Tervuren burns down.
 17 April – Firedamp explosion at Agrappe Mine in Frameries.
 1 July – Law secularising primary education passes, triggering First School War

Publications
Periodicals
 Almanach de Poche de Bruxelles (Brussels, H. Manceaux)
 Bulletin de la Société belge de géographie, 3 (Brussels, Secrétariat de la Société Belge de Géographie)

Books
 Hendrik Conscience, Het wassen beeld
 Léon Vanderkindere, Le siècle des Artevelde: études sur la civilisation morale & politique de la Flandre & du Brabant (Brussels, A.-N. Lebègue).

Art and architecture

 Leuven railway station rebuilt

Births
 5 February – Jules De Bisschop, Olympic rower (died 1954)
 15 February – Camille Van Hoorden, footballer (died 1919)
 28 April – Edgard Tytgat, painter (died 1957)
 29 April – Marie Haps, philanthropist (died 1939)
 22 May – Aston Chichester, bishop (died 1962)
 27 May – Arthur Balbaert, sports shooter (died 1938)
 24 August – Achille Delattre, politician (died 1964)
 26 September – Alexandre Galopin, businessman (died 1944)
 9 October – Edgar Sengier, mining engineer (died 1963)
 21 October – Maurice Beeli, botanist (died 1957)
 25 October – Jean Rogister, musician (died 1964)
 18 December Joseph Lebon, theologian (died 1957)

Deaths
 7 May – Charles De Coster (born 1827), novelist
 19 May – Jules Anspach (born 1829), politician
 16 July – Konrad Martin (born 1812), German bishop
 11 August – Jan Swerts (born 1820), painter
 18 August – Joseph Octave Delepierre (born 1802), antiquary
 24 August – Théodore de Montpellier (born 1807), bishop of Liège
 30 September – Félicien Chapuis (born 1824), entomologist
 3 November – Joseph Poelaert (born 1817), architect
 9 December – Jacob Jacobs (born 1812), painter

References

 
1870s in Belgium
Belgium
Years of the 19th century in Belgium
Belgium